The Leathercoated Minds was a 1966-67 psychedelic studio-based band with Snuff Garrett and J. J. Cale. The band produced one album, A Trip down the Sunset Strip.

Tracks
 "Eight Miles High" (Gene Clark, Jim McGuinn, David Crosby) - 2:03
 "Sunset and Clark" - 1:58
 "Psychotic Reaction" (Ken Ellner, Roy Chaney, Craig Atkinson, John Byrne, John Michalski) - 2:23
 "Over Under Sideways Down" (Chris Dreja, Keith Relf, Jim McCarty, Paul Samwell-Smith) - 2:10
 "Sunshine Superman" (Donovan) - 3:12
 "Non-Stop" - 2:30
 "Arriba" - 2:15
 "Kicks" (Barry Mann, Cynthia Weil) - 2:40
 "Mr. Tambourine Man" (Bob Dylan) - 2:08
 "Puff (The Magic Dragon)" (Peter Yarrow, Leonard Lipton) - 2:26
 "Along Comes Mary" (Tandyn Almer) - 2:00
 "Pot Luck" - 2:04

External links
 The Leathercoated Minds – A Trip Down The Sunset Strip • Discogs

References

American psychedelic rock music groups